Osierfield is an unincorporated community in Irwin County, in the U.S. state of Georgia.

History
A post office was established at Osierfield in 1901, and remained in operation until 1967. The Georgia General Assembly incorporated Osierfield in 1912. The town's municipal charter was repealed in 1995.

References

Former municipalities in Georgia (U.S. state)
Unincorporated communities in Irwin County, Georgia
Populated places disestablished in 1995